Dryden Water Aerodrome  is located  south of Dryden, Ontario, Canada.

See also
Dryden Regional Airport

References

Registered aerodromes in Kenora District
Transport in Dryden, Ontario
Seaplane bases in Ontario